24101 Cassini, provisional designation , is an eccentric background asteroid from the middle region of the asteroid belt, approximately 7 kilometers in diameter. It was discovered on 9 November 1999, by American amateur astronomer Charles Juels at the Fountain Hills Observatory  in Arizona, United States. It was named after Italian–French astronomer Giovanni Cassini.

Orbit and classification 

Cassini is a non-family from the main belt's background population. It orbits the Sun in the central asteroid belt at a distance of 1.8–3.5 AU once every 4 years and 4 months (1,571 days). Its orbit has an eccentricity of 0.31 and an inclination of 15° with respect to the ecliptic.

The body's observation arc begins 7 years prior to its official discovery observation, with a precovery taken at La Silla Observatory in March 1992.

Physical characteristics

Lightcurve 

In February 2009, two rotational lightcurves of Cassini were obtained from photometric observations by Italian astronomer Silvano Casulli, and at the private Shed of Science Observatory in Minnesota, United States. Lightcurve analysis gave a well-defined, concurring rotation period of  hours with a brightness variation of 0.12 magnitude.

Diameter and albedo 

According to observations carried out by the NEOWISE mission of NASA's space-based Wide-field Infrared Survey Explorer, Cassini measures 7.051 kilometer in diameter and its surface has an albedo of 0.2458.

The Collaborative Asteroid Lightcurve Link assumes an albedo of 0.10 – a compromise value between the brighter stony (0.20) and darker carbonaceous (0.057) asteroids of the 2.6 to 2.7 AU-region of the asteroid belt – and correspondingly, calculates a larger diameter of 11.05 kilometers, as the lower a body's albedo (reflectivity), the larger its diameter for a given absolute magnitude (brightness).

Naming 

This minor planet was named in honor of Italian-born French astronomer Giovanni Cassini (1625–1712), who was the first director of the Paris Observatory from 1671 until his death. He discovered the four moons of Saturn – Iapetus, Rhea, Tethys and Dione – the major gap in its rings, known as Cassini Division, and was the first to write down observations of the zodiacal light. The Cassini–Huygens spacecraft is named after him and Christiaan Huygens.

The lunar and Martian craters Cassini are also named in his honor. The approved naming citation was published by the Minor Planet Center on 21 September 2002.

References

References

External links 
 Asteroid Lightcurve Database (LCDB), query form (info )
 Dictionary of Minor Planet Names, Google books
 Asteroids and comets rotation curves, CdR – Observatoire de Genève, Raoul Behrend
 Discovery Circumstances: Numbered Minor Planets (20001)-(25000) – Minor Planet Center
 
 

024101
Discoveries by Charles W. Juels
Named minor planets
24101 Cassini
19991109